The BOTA Tarot (also spelled BOTA, B.o.t.A., or BotA) was created by Paul Foster Case, founder of Builders of the Adytum (BOTA), and artist Jessie Burns Parke. Although it is based upon, and for the most part closely resembles, Arthur Edward Waite's 1909 Rider-Waite deck, Case changed what he said were mistakes or "blinds" on the part of Waite. The BOTA Tarot is available as standard-sized full deck and a larger version containing only the Major Arcana (trump cards; often called "tarot keys" by Case) are black and white, since Case believed that every student needed to color their own deck. After his death, the Major Arcana became also available in color. Each of these cards has a border of a particular color, which is the color that is associated with the card in the writings of Case.

Every trump card has a Hebrew letter written on it in the lower right corner, which is the letter that is associated with the card in the writings of Case. In contrast to some earlier occult tarot decks, which place the Fool card last in order, and associate it with the second-to-last Hebrew letter,  (such decks order the last Hebrew letter, before ), the BOTA deck places the Fool card first in order, and therefore associates it with the first Hebrew letter, aleph. It also orders  before , in the correct order of Hebrew letters.

Differences from the Rider-Waite deck
All of the illustrations on the cards of the BOTA deck differ in at least some minor way from those of the Rider-Waite deck, but some cards contrast much more than others.

The card that contrasts the most between the two decks is the Death card. In the Rider-Waite deck, the Death card depicts the personified figure of Death as an armored knight on a horse, carrying a banner; whereas in the BOTA deck, this figure is depicted as a bare skeleton with a scythe, with a red sky in the background, being based upon the Death card of the Marseille tarot deck.

In the Rider-Waite deck, the Sun card depicts a nude child on a horse, carrying a dull-red banner, whereas in the BOTA deck, the card depicts two nude children standing in a field, being again based upon the Sun card of the Marseille deck.

Various more subtle elements of symbolism also differ between various cards in the two decks.

The "tarot tableau" spread
In his book The Tarot: A Key to the Wisdom of the Ages, Paul Foster Case published the Hebrew letter attributions of the Golden Dawn for the first time. Also made public was Cases's "tarot tableau", a spread (pattern for laying out all of the tarot cards) which Case said revealed certain relationships and dissimilarities among them. This tableau was used by the American branch of Alpha et Omega when Case was the "praemonstrator" (chief instructor) of that order's Thoth–Hermes lodge in Chicago. The tarot tableau is an arrangement of the 22 major arcana cards into 4 horizontal rows that span across 7 vertical columns. On the top row there is only the Fool card, in the center of the row. Rows two through four consist of seven cards each, arranged in sequential order, such that cards 1 through 7 are on row two, cards 8 through 14 are on row three, and cards 15 through 21 are on row four.

Use in meditation and intuition
Builders of the Adytum, although an organization devoted to mysticism (specifically Western esotericism), has repeatedly emphasized that tarot cards are primarily a tool for meditation, not fortune-telling.  Case invented a new, non-magical definition for the word "divination": "the use of spiritual intuition to find solutions to problems". After explaining the BOTA method for tarot divination in his book titled The Tarot: A Key to the Wisdom of the Ages, Case specifically explained the differences between this particular type of divination and fortune-telling. Case then closed with the warning: "Finally, let me reiterate the thought that this is not to be used for vulgar fortune telling, or to amuse a party of friends. If you yield to the temptation so to abuse this information, you will pay for it in the loss of all power of true divination, and probably in the loss of ability to control the higher rates of psychic vibration."

Correspondences to the Qabalistic Cube of Space and Tree of Life
The Tarot: A Key to the Wisdom of the Ages was the first published book to apply almost all of the tarot attributions to the "Cube of Space" diagram. There are 22 Major Arcana tarot cards, which Case corresponded to 22 components of the Cube of Space.

The  is the source of the link between the Cube of Space and the Hebrew letters. The ' itself does not directly mention a "cube of space", nor any kind of cube. Case based the Cube of Space upon two verses in the : the first, in chapter 4, associates six Hebrew letters with six cardinal directions (up, down, east, west, north, south); the second, in chapter 5, associates 12 Hebrew letters with 12 diagonal directional arms or boundaries (different translations use different terms), which Case interpreted as the 12 edges of a cube.

That paragraph does mention a tree, though does not specifically name it the Tree of Life; it states that a tree is inside the twelve diagonals that are mentioned in the Sepher Yetzirah.

Until the publication of Case's The Tarot, most English-speaking occultists had never heard of Case's Cube of Space concept, nor any alleged correspondences between tarot and the Tree of Life diagram, though the latter correspondence have become common in modern times (e.g., many tarot decks feature a Tree of Life diagram on the jacket of the Fool).  Until the mid-1990s, there were almost no other books in print which even mentioned the Cube of Space. The ones that do (sometimes in different terms such as "the Qabalistic Cube") defer to Case's writings on the subject.

References

Bibliography
Writings of Case and others regarding the BOTA Tarot deck:
 Case, Paul Foster; The Book of Tokens: Tarot Meditations
 Case, Paul Foster; The Tarot, A Key to the Wisdom of the Ages
 Case, Paul Foster; Highlights of Tarot
 Davies, Ann; Inspirational Thoughts on the Tarot
 Hulse, David Allen; New Dimensions for the Cube of Space: The Path of Initiation Revealed by the Tarot upon the Qabalistic Cube
 Jayanti, Amber; Living the Tarot
 Lotterhand, Jason C. The Thursday Night Tarot
 Townley, Kevin; The Cube of Space: Container of Creation
 Townley, Kevin;  Meditations on the Cube of Space

External links
 Joyous World: examples of the Qabalah and tarot
 Samples of the B.O.T.A. deck Entire Major Arcana, colored and on some Keys explained.

Divination Tarot decks